Chandok (also spelled as Chandiok and Chandhoke) is a surname found among the Khukrains, which is a sub-caste of Khatri community. They were concentrated in Peshawar and Kabul.

Notable people 

 Archana Chandhoke, Indian actress
 Preet Chandhoke, Technopreneur

 Kanika Kapoor Chandok, Indian singer

 Karun Chandhok, one of the first F1 race drivers of India
 Suhail Chandhok, Indian commentator and actor
 Vicky Chandhok, Indian race driver

References

Indian surnames